El Peñón is a municipality and town of Colombia in the department of Cundinamarca. The municipality, part of the Rionegro Province borders Topaipí in the north, Vergara and Nimaima in the south, Pacho in the east and La Peña and La Palma in the west.

Geology 
The Lower Cretaceous El Peñón Formation is named after El Peñón.

History 
The area of El Peñón before the Spanish conquest was inhabited by the Panche. Modern El Peñón was founded in 1822 by Pedro Bustos as El Peñón de Terama, named after a cacique of the Panche that resisted the Spanish conquistadors and died in 1565.

References 

Municipalities of Cundinamarca Department
Populated places established in 1822
1822 establishments in Gran Colombia